The burrowing chinchilla mouse (Euneomys fossor) is a species of rodent in the family Cricetidae. It is found in Salta Province, Argentina.

References

Euneomys
Mammals of Argentina
Mammals described in 1899
Taxa named by Oldfield Thomas